Latorno is a surname. Notable people with the surname include:

Mary Kay Latorno, American teacher
Alex Latorno